Frydenberg is a surname. Notable people with the surname include:

 Alf Frydenberg (1896–1989), Norwegian civil servant
 Josh Frydenberg (born 1971), Australian politician

See also
 Freudenberg (surname)

Norwegian-language surnames